Eschach is a municipality in the German state of Baden-Württemberg, in Ostalbkreis district.

Mayors
Reinhold Daiss was the mayor from 1986 to 2010. In June 2010 Jochen König was elected the new mayor. He was elected for a second term in June 2018.

References

Ostalbkreis